Alton is an unincorporated community in Jefferson County, Alabama, United States. Alton has a post office with ZIP code 35015. Part of the community has been annexed into the city of Birmingham, while the remainder remains an unincorporated area surrounded by the city.

Demographics
According to the returns from 1850-2010 for Alabama, it has never reported a population figure separately on the U.S. Census.

References

Unincorporated communities in Jefferson County, Alabama
Unincorporated communities in Alabama